The Chicago Fire Department (CFD) provides fire suppression, rescue services, Hazardous Materials Response services and emergency medical response services to the city of Chicago, Illinois, United States, under the jurisdiction of the Mayor of Chicago. The Chicago Fire Department is the second largest municipal fire department in the United States after the New York City Fire Department (FDNY). It is also one of the oldest major organized fire departments in the nation.

The Chicago Fire Department is led by the Fire Commissioner, currently Annette Nance Holt. The Fire Commissioner is appointed by the mayor of Chicago, is confirmed by the Chicago City Council, and is assisted by the First Deputy Commissioner, who oversees the department's bureaus. There are four bureaus under the command of the First Deputy Commissioner: Operations, Fire Prevention, Administrative Services and Logistics.

The Chicago Fire Department receives over 800,000 emergency calls annually.

History

The "Washington Volunteers," the first fire company, was established in 1832.

The first Chicago regulation, which forbade "the passing of any stove pipe through the roof, partition, or siding of any building, unless guarded by tin or iron six inches from the wood," was passed in November 1833. For this infraction, there was a $5.00 fine.
The volunteer fire department was disestablished on August 2, 1858, when the city council passed the ordinance organizing the paid City of Chicago Fire Department.

Organization

Bureaus
There are four Bureaus of Operation within the Chicago Fire Department: Bureau of Operations, Bureau of Administrative Services, Bureau of Logistics and Bureau of Fire Prevention. The four Bureaus are commanded by the 1st Deputy Fire Commissioner, who in turn reports to the Fire Commissioner.

Bureau of Operations
The Bureau of Operations is the largest Bureau within the Chicago Fire Department. The Bureau of Operations commands the following Divisions: Fire Suppression & Rescue, Emergency Medical Services (EMS), Special Operations Command, and the Office of Fire Investigation (OFI). The Bureau of Operations is composed of over 4,500 Uniformed Firefighters and EMS personnel and is commanded by a Deputy Fire Commissioner

The Fire Suppression and Rescue Division is organized into 5 Districts which command a total of 24 Battalions and 1 Special Operations Battalion.

Bureau Of Administrative Services
The Bureau of Administrative Services commands the following Divisions: Personnel, Training, the Photo Unit, and the Employee Assistance Program. The Bureau Of Administrative Services is commanded by a Deputy Fire Commissioner.

Bureau of Logistics
The Bureau of Logistics commands the following Divisions: Support Services, Support & Logistics (EMS), Equipment & Supply, Building & Property Management, Record, Employee Relations, Labor Relations, Staff/Human Relations, the Pension Board, the Regulatory Compliance, and Management Information Systems/Technology. The Bureau of Logistics is commanded by a Deputy Fire Commissioner.

Bureau of Fire Prevention
The Bureau of Fire Prevention commands the following Divisions: Code Compliance and Inspections. The Bureau of Fire Prevention is commanded by a Deputy Fire Commissioner.

Operations
The Bureau of Operations is one of four Bureaus within the organization of the Chicago Fire Department. Like the other Bureaus, the Bureau of Operations is commanded by a Deputy Fire Commissioner, who reports to the 1st Deputy Commissioner, who in-turn reports to the Fire Commissioner. The Bureau of Operations is currently the largest Bureau within the Chicago Fire Department and is organized into four Divisions: Fire Suppression and Rescue, Emergency Medical Services (EMS), Special Operations (including the Technical Rescue Unit, the Hazardous Materials Unit, and the Air-Sea Rescue Unit), and the Office of Fire Investigation (OFI). The Fire Suppression and Rescue Division is commanded by an Assistant Deputy Fire Commissioner. The Special Operations Division and the EMS Division are also commanded by an Assistant Deputy Commissioner. The Office of Fire Investigation (OFI) is under the command of the Commanding Fire Marshal, equivalent to the rank of Deputy District Chief.

In popular culture
The Chicago Fire Department cooperated with film director Ron Howard on making the 1991 film Backdraft, starring Kurt Russell, William Baldwin, and Robert De Niro.

The NBC television show Chicago Fire, centers on a group of fictional firefighters and paramedics at a firehouse that is the headquarters of the fictitious Engine Company 51, Truck Company 81, Rescue Squad Company 3, Battalion Chief 25 and Ambulance 61 (represented by the headquarters for real Engine Company 18).

Gallery

See also
Great Chicago Fire

References

External links

 

 
1858 establishments in Illinois